Tinelli is a surname. Notable people with the surname include:

Marcelo Tinelli (born 1960), Argentine TV host, media producer, and businessman
Tiberio Tinelli (1586–1639), Italian painter

See also
Fiore e Tinelli, an Italian television series
Tonelli (surname)